Statistics of Emperor's Cup in the 1997 season.

Overview
It was contested by 81 teams, and Kashima Antlers won the championship.

Results

1st round
Brummell Sendai 7–0 Yamaga Club
Iwami FC 0–7 Juntendo University
Mitsubishi Nagasaki SC 2–1 Hatsushiba Hashimoto High School
Mito HollyHock 3–0 Hokkaido Electric Power
Nirasaki Astros 0–2 NTT Kanto
Mitsubishi Motors Mizushima 0–0 (PK 6–7) Yamagata FC
Kusatsu Higashi High School 0–3 Sagan Tosu
Nara Sangyo University 3–1 Nippon Steel Corporation Oita FC
Saga Commercial High School 1–5 Oita Trinity
Mind House Yokkaichi 0–3 Momoyama Gakuin University
Kansai University 0–9 Tokyo Gas
Ehime Youth 2–1 Alo's Hokuriku
Blaze Kumamoto 0–2 Honda
Kwansei Gakuin University 2–6 Albirex Niigata
Jatco 1–0 Okinawa International University
Kagawa Shiun Club 1–0 Waseda University
Seino Transportation 5–0 Kochi University
Moka High School 1–5 Kokushikan University
Tottori 0–7 Kawasaki Frontale
Honda Luminoso Sayama 4–1 Nippon Steel Corporation Kamaishi FC
Kanagawa University 1–3 Ventforet Kofu
Fukuoka University 5–1 Akita City Hall
Aoyama Gakuin University 1–0 Denso
FC Primeiro 0–1 Hannan University
Maebashi Commercial High School 0–6 Fukushima
Nagoya Bank 3–4 Fukui Teachers
Kyoiku Kenkyusha 0–5 Montedio Yamagata
Hosho High School 3–2 Takagawa Gakuen High School
Kagoshima Commercial High School 1–2 Consadole Sapporo
Hiroshima University 2–3 Aster Aomori
Otsuka Pharmaceuticals 8–1 Teihens FC
Funabashi Municipal High School 0–2 Komazawa University

2nd round
Brummell Sendai 0–1 Juntendo University
Verdy Kawasaki 2–0 Mitsubishi Nagasaki SC
Mito HollyHock 1–2 Avispa Fukuoka
NTT Kanto 1–0 Yamagata FC
Sagan Tosu 4–0 Nara Sangyo University
Oita Trinity 1–1 (PK 3–5) Momoyama Gakuin University
Tokyo Gas 2–1 Ehime Youth
Honda 3–1 Albirex Niigata
Jatco 6–0 Kagawa Shiun Club
Seino Transportation 1–2 Kokushikan University
Kawasaki Frontale 3–0 Honda Luminoso Sayama
Ventforet Kofu 2–1 Fukuoka University
Aoyama Gakuin University 0–1 Hannan University
Fukushima 1–0 Fukui Teachers
Montedio Yamagata 8–0 Hosho High School
Consadole Sapporo 4–1 Aster Aomori
Otsuka Pharmaceuticals 1–3 Komazawa University

3rd round
Kashima Antlers 4–1 Juntendo University
Verdy Kawasaki 0–2 Avispa Fukuoka
Urawa Red Diamonds 2–1 NTT Kanto
Gamba Osaka 3–2 Sagan Tosu
Yokohama Marinos 5–0 Momoyama Gakuin University
Nagoya Grampus Eight 1–3 Tokyo Gas
Kyoto Purple Sanga 3–2 Honda
Bellmare Hiratsuka 7–0 Jatco
Kashiwa Reysol 4–1 Kokushikan University
Vissel Kobe 2–0 Kawasaki Frontale
Cerezo Osaka 5–1 Ventforet Kofu
Júbilo Iwata 3–0 Hannan University
Shimizu S-Pulse 3–0 Fukushima
Sanfrecce Hiroshima 3–1 Montedio Yamagata
JEF United Ichihara 1–0 Consadole Sapporo
Yokohama Flügels 4–3 Komazawa University

4th round
Kashima Antlers 6–0 Avispa Fukuoka
Urawa Red Diamonds 1–2 Gamba Osaka
Yokohama Marinos 1–2 Tokyo Gas
Kyoto Purple Sanga 1–5 Bellmare Hiratsuka
Kashiwa Reysol 2–1 Vissel Kobe
Cerezo Osaka 2–3 Júbilo Iwata
Shimizu S-Pulse 3–1 Sanfrecce Hiroshima
JEF United Ichihara 1–2 Yokohama Flügels

Quarterfinals
Kashima Antlers 3–0 Gamba Osaka
Tokyo Gas 3–2 Bellmare Hiratsuka
Kashiwa Reysol 1–2 Júbilo Iwata
Shimizu S-Pulse 1–6 Yokohama Flügels

Semifinals
Kashima Antlers 3–1 Tokyo Gas
Júbilo Iwata 2–3 Yokohama Flügels

Final

Kashima Antlers 3–0 Yokohama Flügels
Kashima Antlers won the championship.

References
 NHK

Emperor's Cup
Emperor's Cup
1998 in Japanese football